Heine Johnsøn Havreki (1514–1576) or Heine the shipwrecked was a Norwegian born Lutheran pastor who helped introduce the Protestant Reformation on the Faroe Islands.

Biography
Heine Johnsøn was reportedly born in Bergen, Norway the son of  Jon Haraldson, an Icelandic Roman Catholic minister. While Havreki was studying in Bergen, he and some other students were travelling to Iceland but were caught up in bad weather and shipwrecked  in the Faroe islands. They were taken care of by a local woman, Herborg of Húsavík, with whom he subsequently became married. Together they had a son Jógvan Heinason (1541–1602) and   daughter Herborg Heinadottir (born 1542).<ref name="weebly">{{cite web |url=http://nesforn.weebly.com/english.html |title=Fornminnisfelagið og Bygdarsavnið í Nes Kommunu - The 'Old Vicarage' Museum (The Antiques Society & Museum in Nes Municipality) |publisher=nesforn.weebly.com |access-date=2015-12-02 |archive-url=https://web.archive.org/web/20160304230604/http://nesforn.weebly.com/english.html |archive-date=2016-03-04 |url-status=dead}}</ref>

In 1534, he served as deputy to Ámundur Olavsson, the last Roman Catholic bishop of the Diocese of the Faroe Islands. Ámundur Olavsson held his office, based at Kirkjubøur, until he was forced to yield his see and title in 1538. Following the Protestant Reformation, Heine was one of the first Lutheran priests in the Faroe islands as vicar for the island of Eysturoy. Heine was consecrated on Ólavsøka in 1541 when the church became Protestant.

Following the death of Heine's wife Herborg, he traveled back to Norway. There around 1544, he married Gyri Arnbjørnsdatter. Together they had a son Magnus Heinason (1548–1589). In 1566, Heine served at a church on Radøy in the Nordhordland district in Hordaland where he later died.

See also
Roman Catholicism in the Faroe Islands
Church of the Faroe Islands

References

Other sourcesFæroæ & Færoa reserata by Lucas Debes written in 1673Natural and political history of the  Faroe Islands in the Danish translation by C. G. Mengel, Copenhagen / Leipzig 1757. comments by  Norbert B. Vogt. Mülheim a. d. Ruhr: 2005. S. 130

Related reading
 Young, G.V.C. (1979) From the Vikings to the Reformation. A Chronicle of the Faroe Islands up to 1538'' (Isle of Man: Shearwater Press) 

1514 births
1576 deaths
Clergy from Bergen
16th-century Norwegian Lutheran clergy
Faroese people of Icelandic descent
Norwegian emigrants to the Faroe Islands
Shipwreck survivors